Tsukimi Namiki (. Namiki Tsukimi) is a Japanese amateur boxer. She won the bronze medal in the women's flyweight event at the 2020 Summer Olympics.

Career 
She began boxing in 2013. In 2015, she competed at the Balkan Women’s Youth Tournament, winning a gold medal, 2018 Republic of Kazakhstan President’s Cup, winning a gold medal, and  2018 AIBA Women’s World Boxing Championships, winning a bronze medal.

She advanced through the Asia and Oceania tournament to qualify for the 2020 Summer Olympics.

References

External links 

 

1998 births
Living people
Japanese women boxers
Boxers at the 2020 Summer Olympics
Medalists at the 2020 Summer Olympics
Olympic bronze medalists for Japan
Olympic medalists in boxing
AIBA Women's World Boxing Championships medalists
Sportspeople from Chiba Prefecture
People from Narita, Chiba
Olympic boxers of Japan
21st-century Japanese women